Disconaias is a genus of freshwater mussels, aquatic bivalve mollusks in the family Unionidae, the river mussels.

Species within the genus Disconaias
 Disconaias disca

Unionidae
Bivalve genera
Taxonomy articles created by Polbot